ERD may refer to:

 Érd, a city in Hungary
 Berdyansk Airport, in Ukraine
 Economic Relations Division (Bangladesh), of the Bangladeshi Ministry of Finance
 Elastic recoil detection
 Emergency repair disk
 Emergency Reserve Decoration, a British military decoration
 Enfants Riches Déprimés, a fashion brand
 Entity-relationship diagram
 Erdington railway station, in England
 Evolutionary rapid development
 Extended reach drilling